Richard Paul Russo (born 1954) is an American science fiction writer.

He attended the Clarion Workshop in 1983; his first story, "Firebird Suite", appeared in Amazing Stories in 1981 and his first novel, Inner Eclipse, was published in 1988. His second novel, Subterranean Gallery, won the Philip K. Dick Award for 1989. He won that award again in 2001 for Ship of Fools. Subterranean Gallery was also a finalist for the Arthur C. Clarke Award.

As of 2010 he lives in Seattle, Washington with his wife Candace, four cats and a dog.

Bibliography

Novels about Lt. Frank Carlucci
 Destroying Angel (1992)
 Carlucci's Edge (1995)
 Carlucci's Heart (1997)

An omnibus of the three was published in 2003 as Carlucci.

Singleton novels
Inner Eclipse (1988)
Subterranean Gallery (1989)
Ship of Fools (2001)
Entitled as Unto Leviathan in the United Kingdom.
The Rosetta Codex (2005)

Collection
Terminal Visions (2000)

Online stories
The Dread and Fear of Kings

External links
Sci-Fiction biography segment

Golden Gryphon Press official site - About Terminal Visions

Reviews
Short story collection - Nick Gevers
Ship of Fools - John Grant
Ship of Fools - Claude Lalumière

Interviews
Interview at Infinity plus
Interview at scifi.com

20th-century American novelists
21st-century American novelists
American male novelists
American science fiction writers
Living people
1954 births
American male short story writers
20th-century American short story writers
21st-century American short story writers
20th-century American male writers
21st-century American male writers